Ken Mitchell (born 15 September 1930) is a British racing cyclist. He rode in the 1955 Tour de France.

References

External links
 

1930 births
Living people
British male cyclists
Place of birth missing (living people)